Burlington Soccer Club is a Canadian semi-professional soccer club based in Burlington, Ontario that plays in League1 Ontario.

History
The club was founded in 1962 under the name Burlington Police Minor Soccer. In 1975, the club incorporated and changed their name to Burlington Youth Soccer Club; soon after in 1979, they won their first Ontario Cup. The club has created an Embracing Ability program designed to make soccer accessible for all including players with intellectual and physical disabilities. After greatly expanding their adult program, they again renamed the club in 2019 to Burlington Soccer Club. The club's competitive teams are known as the Burlington Bayhawks, with their team mascot being named Burli the Bayhawk.

The club joined League1 Ontario for the 2022 after acquiring the license previously held by 1812 FC Barrie. They will be entering teams in both the male and female divisions, along with a men's reserve team in 2022, and adding a women's reserve team in 2023.

Squad

Current squad

Seasons

Men

Women

Notable players
The following players have either played at the professional or international level, either before or after playing for the League1 Ontario team:

Men

Women

References

Soccer clubs in Ontario
League1 Ontario teams
Soccer clubs in Burlington, Ontario
1962 establishments in Ontario
Association football clubs established in 1962